Ernocornutia limona is a species of moth of the family Tortricidae. It is endemic to Ecuador (Morona-Santiago Province).

References

External links

Moths described in 2006
Endemic fauna of Ecuador
Euliini
Moths of South America
Taxa named by Józef Razowski